The discography of French disco musician Cerrone, including the discography of Kongas, in which Cerrone was a member during the 1970s, consists of 23 studio albums, 5 live albums, and 19 compilation albums.

Albums

Studio albums

Live albums

Soundtrack albums and other productions

Compilation albums

Box sets

Singles

References

Discographies of French artists
Disco discographies